Noen Kum is a subdistrict (tambon) in the Bang Krathum District of Phitsanulok Province, Thailand.

Geography
Noen Kum borders Wat Ta Yom to the north, Wang Thong District to the north-east, Phichit Province to the south and south-east, Phai Lom to the west and Nakhon Pa Mak to the north-west.

Noen Kum lies in the Nan Basin, which is part of the Chao Phraya Watershed. The Wat Ta Yom River flows through Noen Kum.

Administration
The subdistrict is divided into 11 smaller divisions called (muban), which roughly correspond to the villages in Noen Kum. There are seven villages, several of which occupy multiple muban. Noen Kum is administered by a Tambon administrative organization (TAO). The muban in Noen Kum are enumerated as follows:

Economy
The economy of Noen Kum is almost entirely based on rice farming and other agriculture.

Temples
Noen Kum is home to the following seven temples:
Wat Dongmee (Dongmee Village Temple) in Ban Dongmee
Wat Noen Kum (Noen Kum Village Temple) in Ban Noen Kum
วัดราษฎร์ศรัทธาราม in Ban Noen Kum
Wat Sa Settee (Thai:  วัดสระเศรษฐี, Wealthy Man's Pond Temple) in Ban Tha Yang
วัดราษฎร์สถิต in Ban Nong Grot
Wat Mai Prai Manee in Ban Wat Mai Prai Manee
Wat Nong Grot (Nong Grot Villate Temple) in Ban Nong Grot

References

Tambon of Phitsanulok province
Populated places in Phitsanulok province